Róbert Ingi Douglas (born 4 June 1973, in Reykjavík) is an Icelandic film director, screenwriter and cinematographer who made his feature film debut with Íslenski draumurinn (2000). That film became a sleeper hit in the summer of 2000 becoming one of Iceland's biggest box-office hits that year. Róbert Douglas followed the success of his first film with a darker film about subtle racism in Iceland's society, A Man Like Me (2002). That film proved to be another commercial success in Iceland. Douglas then made Eleven Men Out (2005), a film about an all-gay soccer team. The film has already become a success outside of Iceland and is the director's first film to do so. Before making Eleven Men Out, Douglas made a documentary for television. This Is Sanlitun (2013), a comedy feature film set in Beijing is Douglas's latest film and premiered at the Toronto International Film Festival in 2013, it is Douglas's first English language film.

Douglas is half Northern Irish and half Icelandic. His mother is from Iceland and his father is from Northern Ireland.

Filmography
 The Icelandic Dream (Icelandic Íslenski draumurinn) (2000)
 A Man Like Me (Icelandic. Maður eins og ég) (2002)
 Small Mall (Icelandic. Mjóddin slá í gegn) (2004)
 Eleven Men Out (Icelandic. Strákarnir okkar) (2005)
 This Is Sanlitun (2013)

References

External links

1973 births
Living people
Robert Ingi Douglas
Robert Ingi Douglas
Robert Ingi Douglas
Robert Ingi Douglas